Dede Fedrizzi is a Brazilian film maker, photographer, art director and artist, who concentrates on portraiture and advertising imagery. He is also the creator of the mini-profile TV documentary series entitled, Meet Joe. His frequently explicit photographs have been exhibited globally, often framed in sculptural forms (made from driftwood or metal) that he builds himself.
He is a supporter of former right-wing president Jair Bolsonaro.

Life and career
Born in southern Brazil, Fedrizzi began traveling out of his native Porto Alegre at a very early age in pursuit of photography assignments. He has since visited over thirty countries and has lived and worked in São Paulo, Spain, Switzerland, Greece, Germany, and New York. He is currently based in São Paulo, Brazil.

Fedrizzi has photographed several multi-national ad campaigns including Panasonic, MTV and TIM Brasil, his work has also been published in hundreds of magazines including; Vogue Elle, Cosmopolitan, Zingmagazine, UP Magazine (Portugal), Playboy, Trip (Brazil) and Art in America.

His celebrity photography subjects have included Pelé, Neymar, Milla Jovovich, Ithaka Darin Pappas and Leonard Nimoy.

Exhibitions
1979 Alfred Gallery (Caxias do Sul, Brazil)
1981 Eucatexpo Gallery (Porto Alegre, Brazil)
1983 SSC: Sea Study Center (Tramandai, Brazil)
1986 Leica Gallery (Zurich)
1987 Embassy of Brazil (Madrid)
1989 Tenth Biennial of arts (São Paulo)
1990 Galeria Atenas (Greece)
1990 Léquipe Gallery – "People" (São Paulo)
1991 Photo Factory Gallery (Munich)
1992 Le Nu (Paris)
1993 Gallery Teatro Municipal (Porto Alegre, Brazil)
1995 Hugo Boss (São Paulo)                                                      
1997 Dactyl Foundation Gallery (New York) Best Picture Award 
1999 Young & Rubicam Gallery (New York)
1999 Camel in Focus (São Paulo)
2009 Dalmau Studio (São Paulo)
2010 Espaço Fabrika (São Paulo)
2013 Contempo Gallery (São Paulo)
2013 MIXTAPE Design (São Paulo)
2013 ROMART: International Biennial of Art and Culture (Rome). Gold Medal Winner
2015 Prego Gallery, (São Paulo)

Articles and interviews
2009 Sinos Foto Clube (Brazil)
2009 Unit Magazine (Brazil)
2011 FMAG (Brazil)

References

Brazilian photographers
Social documentary photographers
1959 births
Living people
Brazilian contemporary artists
Brazilian journalists
Brazilian people of Italian descent
20th-century photographers
21st-century photographers
20th-century Brazilian artists
21st-century Brazilian artists